{{Infobox television
| network        = ZEE5, ALTBalaji
| caption        =
| genre          = 
| runtime        = 24 minutes
| director       = Prashant Bhagia
| writer         = {{Plain list| 
Suparn VermaRitu Bhatia
}}
| country        = India
| language       = Hindi
| location       = India
| image          = His Story (web series).jpg
| picture_format = HDTV, 1080i
| company        = Ding Entertainment
| producer       = 
| num_seasons    = 1
| num_episodes   = 11
| list_episodes  = His Storyy (web series)#Episodes
| released       = 
| camera         = Multi-camera
| distributor    = ZEE5, ALTBalaji
| audio_format   = Dolby Digital
| starring       = 
| cinematography = Srinivas Achary 
}}His Storyy (alternatively titled His Story) is an Indian, Hindi-language romantic drama web series directed by Prashant Bhagia. It is an ALTBalaji and ZEE5 original, released on 25 April 2021. It stars Satyadeep Mishra, Priyamani Raj, and Mrinal Dutt in the lead roles. The series was produced by Tanveer Bookwala and Ding Entertainment, and was written by Suparn Verma and Ritu Bhatia. The series revolves around the life of Sakshi, Kunal and his lover Preet and the social issue of acceptance of homosexuals by the society and family.

 Plot 
Sakshi and Kunal are a South-Bombay power couple who are running a business together. Sakshi is the head chef and Kunal takes care of the business end of the restaurant. They have two children, Shlok and Shivaay. Things fall apart for Sakshi when she realizes that her 20 years of familial and marital bliss was nothing but a pack of lies. Kunal has an extra-marital affair with a man called Preet and this destroys Sakshi. The couple decide to separate and end the marriage. Kunal moves in with Preet; but the family, especially his eldest son Shivaay, doesn't take this very well. He is homophobic and abuses his father as well his friend Ved, who is discovering his sexuality in his adolescence. Shlok and Sakshi accept the truth and decide to move on. But due to various events that occur, the story does not have a happy ending.

 Cast 
The prime cast of the show is:
 Satyadeep Mishra as Kunal
 Priyamani as Sakshi
 Mrinal Dutt as Preet
 Nitin Bhatia as Shivaay, elder son of Kunal and Sakshi
 Mikhail Gandhi as Shlok, younger son of Kunal and Sakshi
 Charu Shankar as Rafia
 Rheanne Tejani as Jhanvi, daughter of Rafia
 Rajeev Kumar as Nihal
 Parinitaa Seth as Loveleen, Nihal's wife
 Anmol Kajani as Ved, son of Nihal and Loveleen
 Shruthy Menon as Rati, works with Sakshi

 Episodes 

 Soundtrack 
The series has an original soundtrack consisting of 5 songs. In their review of the series, Amar Ujala appreciated the work of music directors Kartik Shah, Abhiruchi Chand and Abhishek Arora for their original scores and of playback singer Sukanya Purkayasth for her rendering of song "Naina Kahe Bhar Aaye".

 Release and reception 
On 9 April 2021, the promo video and poster of the series were released. However, the released poster that showed Mishra and Dutt spooning, was criticized for similarities with the poster of 2015 film Loev directed by Sudhanshu Saria. Saria, film director Vikramaditya Motwane and various others criticized AltBalaji over various social networking platforms. AltBalaji issued an apology on 11 April and pulled down the poster.

The series was released on 25 April 2021 on the digital platforms of ALTBalaji and Zee5. It was reported by Bollywood Hungama that the end of the story, which would have shown the wedding of the lead gay characters, was changed by the creators given the prevailing social discrimination against the LGBTQIA+ community in India. It also informed that second season of the series may or may not happen depending on the change in prejudiced atmosphere towards the community in the real society. Various intimate scenes shot between Mishra and Dutt were also edited out by creators as self-censorship to avoid getting into troubles, except for few discreet kissing scenes.

Subhash Jha from SpotboyE rates this web series at 3/5. In his own words, "No matter how you look at it His Storyy is a game-changer for same-sex celluloid stories in India. It shows its layered characters, played with rock-star assurance by the cast that knows its job, making some tough choices in life and standing by them. For this alone His Storyy must be seen at your earliest." The Times of India rates His Story at 3/5. "‘His Story’ is a decent attempt at starting a dialogue on eradicating homophobia that still—sadly—exists in our country. Honest performances make this LGBTQIA-centric drama a delightful watch." Amar Ujala gives 2/5 and criticizes the series for being a typical Ekta Kapoor series and is unable to be part of the real world. The setting and the weak dialogues have been criticized which do not enable to the lead actors to perform up to their mark. Roles of supporting actors played by Charu Shankar, Rheanne Tejani and Mikhail Gandhi have been appreciated.

 References 

 External links His Storyy at ALTBalaji

 His Storyy'' at ZEE5

Indian web series
Indian LGBT-related web series
2021 Indian television series debuts